Wróblewski (feminine Wróblewska) is a Polish locational surname, which originally meant a person from one of several places called Wróblew or Wróblewo in Poland, with these villages in turn named for the Polish word wróbel ("sparrow"). Alternative spellings abroad include Wroblewski and Wroblewsky. Russian-language transliteration: Vrublevsky, Latvian: Vrubļevskis, Lithuanian: Vrublevskis.

Notable people include:

Andrzej Wróblewski (1927–1957), Polish painter
Andrzej Krzysztof Wróblewski (1935–2012), Polish journalist
Anna Wroblewski (born 1985), American poker player
Augustyn Wróblewski (1866–1913), Polish anarchist
Bogusław Wróblewski (born 1955), Polish literary critic
Bartłomiej Wróblewski (born 1975), Polish politician
David Wroblewski (born 1959), American novelist
Franciszek Wróblewski (1789–1857), Polish doctor
Jan Ptaszyn Wróblewski (born 1936), Polish musician
Jan Wróblewski (glider pilot) (born 1940), Polish glider pilot
Jerzy Wróblewski (1926–1990), Polish legal scholar
Krystyna Wróblewska (1904–1994), Polish artist
Paul Wroblewski, British television director
Stanisław Wróblewski (born 1959), Polish wrestler
Tadeusz Wróblewski (1858–1925), Polish politician
Tomasz Wróblewski (born 1980), Polish musician
Walery Antoni Wróblewski (1836–1908), Polish politician
Władysław Wróblewski (1875–1951), Polish politician
Zygmunt Florenty Wróblewski (1845–1888), Polish scientist

See also

House of Wróblewski
Wróblewski (crater)

References

Polish-language surnames
Toponymic surnames